The men's 4 × 200 metre freestyle relay event in swimming at the 2013 World Aquatics Championships took place on 2 August at the Palau Sant Jordi in Barcelona, Spain.

Records
Prior to this competition, the existing world and championship records were:

Results

Heats
The heats were held at 11:11.

Final
The final was held at 19:41.

References

External links
Barcelona 2013 Swimming Coverage

Freestyle 4x200 metre, men's
World Aquatics Championships